The Prague Grand Prix is an annual running event which takes place in September in Prague, Czech Republic. It is a 10-kilometre race organised in the attractive surroundings of Prague city centre during evening twilight. The race was introduced in 1997 as the O2 Prague Grand Prix, and is a part of the RunCzech running circuit. The event holds IAAF Gold Label Road Race status.

The new course was introduced in 2013 and course records are held by Kenya's Rhonex Kipruto and Joyciline Jepkosgei.

Past winners

Key:

References

External links

 Prague Grand Prix official website

10K runs
Athletics competitions in the Czech Republic
Recurring sporting events established in 1997
1997 establishments in the Czech Republic
Sport in Prague
Autumn events in the Czech Republic